A mass tort is a civil action involving numerous plaintiffs against one or a few defendants in state or federal court. The lawsuits arise out of the defendants causing numerous injuries through the same or similar act of harm (e.g. a prescription drug, a medical device, a defective product, a train accident, a plane crash, pollution, or a construction disaster).

Law firms sometimes use mass media to reach potential plaintiffs.

The main categories of mass torts include:
 Medical device injuries
 Motor vehicle defects
 Prescription drug injuries
 Product liability injuries
 Toxic contamination

In U.S. federal courts, mass tort claims are often consolidated as multidistrict litigation. In some cases, mass torts are addressed through a class action.

In popular culture

Further reading

References

External links 
 Mass Tort Litigation Blog
 Anatomy of a Mass Tort
 Understanding Mass Personal Injury Litigation
 Cutting-Edge Approaches for Managing Mass Tort Litigation in the New Millenium (sic)

Tort law